Kurrajong is an abandoned town located between Leonora and Leinster along the Old Agnew Road in the Goldfields–Esperance region of Western Australia.

Gold was discovered in the area in 1894 and one of the earliest mines was the Diorite King, which was also used as the town name. H.S. King surveyed lots in the town in 1897 and the town was gazetted in 1899.

Cobb and Co. operated a coach service to Coolgardie from the town in 1898 and opened another to Leonora in 1903. The first hotel licence was issued in 1898 and continued to operate until 1918.

The name of the town is Aboriginal in origin and is the name of a tree that is commonly found in the area.

References 

Mining towns in Western Australia
Ghost towns in Western Australia
Shire of Leonora